Eucamptognathus andriai is a species of ground beetle in the subfamily Pterostichinae. It was described by Deuve in 1982.

References

Eucamptognathus
Beetles described in 1982